Landegode Lighthouse is a coastal lighthouse in Bodø Municipality in Nordland county, Norway.

History
The lighthouse was built in 1902 and automated in 1988. The lighthouse was listed as a protected site in 1999. It emits three flashes of white light every 40 seconds. The light is active from dusk to dawn from 4 August until 2 May each year. The light is not active in the summer due to the midnight sun in the region.

See also

Lighthouses in Norway
List of lighthouses in Norway

References

External links
 Norsk Fyrhistorisk Forening 
 

Lighthouses completed in 1902
Lighthouses in Nordland
Buildings and structures in Bodø
Listed lighthouses in Norway
1902 establishments in Norway